In music, Op. 4 stands for Opus number 4. Compositions that are assigned this number include:

 Beethoven – String Quintet, Op. 4
 Berg – Altenberg Lieder
 Bliss – String Quartet in A major
 Brahms – Scherzo
 Britten – Simple Symphony
 Chopin – Piano Sonata No. 1
 David – Trombone Concertino
 Dommayer – Gunstwerber
 Dvořák – Symphony No. 2
 Elgar – Idylle
 G. English – Symphony No. 1
 Handel – Organ concertos, Op. 4
 Madetoja – Elegia
 Mendelssohn – Violin Sonata in F minor
 Reger – Sechs Lieder, Op. 4
 Schiele – Verklärte Nacht
 Schumann – Intermezzi
 Schütz – Cantiones sacrae
 Strauss – Kettenbrücke-Walzer
 Stravinsky – Feu d'artifice
 Vivaldi – La stravaganza
 Wieniawski – Polonaise de Concert, Op. 4
 Zandonai – Francesca da Rimini